Leucopogon infuscatus is a species of flowering plant in the heath family Ericaceae and is endemic to the south-west of Western Australia. It is a shrublet with many branches, egg-shaped to lance-shaped leaves, and light brown, densely bearded flowers.

Description
Flowering mainly occurs in August and September.

Taxonomy and naming
Leucopogon infuscatus was first formally described in 1986 by Arne Strid in the journal Willdenowia from specimens he collected near Ravensthorpe along the road to Esperance in 1982. The specific epithet (infuscatus) is derived from the Latin word infusco, meaning "to darken", referring to flower parts which darken and dry as they age.

Distribution and habitat
This leucopogon grows on ridgetops and flats in the Esperance Plains bioregion of south-western Western Australia.

Conservation status
Leucopogon infuscatus is classified as "not threatened" by the Western Australian Government Department of Biodiversity, Conservation and Attractions.

References

infuscatus
Ericales of Australia
Flora of Western Australia
Plants described in 1986
Taxa named by Arne Strid